Rosa Pam Durban (born March 4, 1947 Aiken, South Carolina) is an American novelist and short story writer.

Life
Durban graduated from the University of North Carolina at Greensboro and from the University of Iowa with an M.F.A. in 1979.  She wrote for the Atlanta Gazette from 1974 to 1975.

She taught at the State University of New York at Geneseo, Murray State University, and Ohio University. She was also founding co-editor, along with David Bottoms of Five Points.
She taught at Georgia State University from 1986 to 2001 and at the University of North Carolina at Chapel Hill from 2001.

Her work has appeared in Blackbird Review, Tri-Quarterly, Crazyhorse, the Georgia Review, The Southern Review, Epoch, The New Virginia Review, and The Ohio Review.

Awards
 2001 Lillian Smith Book Award for So Far Back
 1994 Townsend Prize for The Laughing Place
 1987 Whiting Award in Fiction
 1984 Rinehart Award for Fiction

Works

Anthologies

Stories and essays

References

External links
Whiting Foundation Profile

People from Aiken, South Carolina
1947 births
20th-century American novelists
University of North Carolina at Greensboro alumni
University of Iowa alumni
State University of New York at Geneseo faculty
Murray State University faculty
Ohio University faculty
Georgia State University faculty
University of North Carolina at Chapel Hill faculty
Living people
21st-century American novelists
American women novelists
20th-century American women writers
21st-century American women writers
20th-century American short story writers
21st-century American short story writers
Kentucky women writers
Novelists from Ohio
Novelists from New York (state)
Novelists from Kentucky
Novelists from Georgia (U.S. state)
American women academics